Kuznetsovsky is a rural locality (a settlement) in Osikovskoye Rural Settlement, Kantemirovsky District, Voronezh Oblast, Russia. The population was 311 as of 2010. There are 2 streets.

Geography 
Kuznetsovsky is located 41 km east of Kantemirovka (the district's administrative centre) by road. Osikovka is the nearest rural locality.

References 

Rural localities in Kantemirovsky District